Andrea Caianiello (born 24 September 1987) is an Italian rower.

Biography
He was part of the Italian men's lightweight coxless four team at the 2012 Summer Olympics.

References

External links
 

1987 births
Living people
Italian male rowers
Rowers from Naples
Rowers at the 2012 Summer Olympics
Olympic rowers of Italy
World Rowing Championships medalists for Italy
Rowers of Fiamme Oro